Marie Wright may refer to:

 Marie Wright (actress), British stage and film actress
 Marie Wright (curler), Canadian wheelchair curler
 Marie Robinson Wright, American travel writer